Rustam Zakirov (19 December 1989 – 15 April 2020) was a Kyrgyzstani footballer who was a midfielder. He was well known for playing for Abdish-Ata Kant and Alga Bishkek. He was a member of the Kyrgyzstan national football team.

Career statistics

International

Statistics accurate as of match played 30 September 2009

References

External links

1989 births
2020 deaths
Kyrgyzstani footballers
Footballers at the 2010 Asian Games
Association football midfielders
Asian Games competitors for Kyrgyzstan
Kyrgyzstan international footballers